London & Partners (L&P) is London's business growth and destination agency. Their mission is to create economic growth that is resilient, sustainable and inclusive.

History
It was set up by the Mayor of London, Boris Johnson, on 1 April 2011. It is a PPP and not-for-profit business focused on promotion of London driving jobs and growth for the city.

Governance
London and Partners is a not-for-profit private company limited by guarantee. The Board Chairman is Rajesh Agrawal and the Chief Executive Officer is Laura Citron.

Campaigns
It has an annual budget of £12 million.

References

External links

2011 establishments in England
Greater London Authority functional bodies